Belonogovo is a rural locality (a selo) in Ozyornensky Selsoviet of Seryshevsky District, Amur Oblast, Russia. The population was 1,345 as of 2018. There are 10  streets.

Geography 
Belonogovo is located 8 km north of Seryshevo (the district's administrative centre) by road. Seryshevo is the nearest rural locality.

References 

Rural localities in Seryshevsky District